The RML 7-inch guns were various designs of medium-sized rifled muzzle-loading guns used to arm small to medium-sized British warships in the late 19th century, and some were used ashore for coast defence.

Design and history 

These guns were the first to incorporate the new "Woolwich" rifling system, a modification of the French system, of from 3 – 9 broad shallow grooves after Britain abandoned the Armstrong "shunt" rifling system in May 1865 : "...M.L. 7-inch guns in course of manufacture were rifled on this principle, upon which all of our heavy pieces since have been rifled. The 7-inch referred to, and introduced into the service in 1865, were the first of the so-called Woolwich guns, which then meant "wrought iron M.L. guns built up on Sir W. Armstrong's principle, improved upon by hooking the coils over one another, and having solid ended steel barrels, rifled on the system shown above, for studded projectiles".

All versions were constructed of a steel A tube surrounded by various numbers and thicknesses of wrought-iron coils. Rifling was 3 grooves with a uniform 1 turn in 35 calibres i.e. in 245 inches.

The diagrams below show the progression from the original expensive Armstrong construction in Mk I of multiple relatively thin coils, through to the simplified and cheaper Woolwich design of Mk III.

RML 7-inch 7 ton gun 

This was a coast defence gun introduced in 1865 to replace the failed RBL 7-inch Armstrong gun.Three marks were produced.

RML 7-inch 6½ ton gun 
This was a naval gun introduced in 1865 "...as a broadside or pivot gun for frigates, to replace the 7-inch B.L. and 68-pr S.B. guns, and is now very extensively used, 331 having been made... These guns are in total length 18 inches shorter than the land service [i.e. 7-ton] 7-inch gun, being a length more suited to the requirements of the Navy".

The following warships were armed with the gun :
 s in commission from 1865
  commissioned in 1866
  commissioned 1866
  commissioned 1866
 s commissioned 1867
 s in commission from 1867
 s (as re-gunned in 1867)
  &  (as re-gunned in 1868)
 s (as re-gunned in 1867–1868)
 s (from 1868)
  (as re-gunned in 1868)
  in commission from 1869
  in commission from 1876
 Briton-class screw corvettes in commission from 1871

RML 7-inch 90 cwt gun 
This was a lighter (90 cwt = 4½ tons) low-powered naval gun introduced in 1874 as a broadside gun on unarmoured vessels, and not intended for attacking armour plate. Early models were made by simply turning off some of the jacket around 7-inch 6½ ton guns, as firing with reduced charges placed less strain on the coils. Some new guns were made to similar design.

The following warships were armed with the gun :
 s in commission from 1874
  in commission from 1874
 s in commission from 1874
 s in commission from 1877
 s in commission from 1877

Ammunition 
The primary projectile for 7 ton and 6½ ton guns was Palliser shot or shell for attacking armoured warships, fired with a large "battering" charge for maximum velocity. All guns were also equipped with shrapnel shells for anti-personnel use and explosive common shells for attacking unarmoured targets. The "double" common shell was much longer than the standard common shell, and hence contained approximately twice as much gunpowder. It was unstable in flight and hence inaccurate beyond 2,000 yards but was considered useful for attacking wooden warships at ranges below 2,000 yards.

This was the only RML heavy gun not to be issued with gas-checks.

Surviving examples 
 Restored 6½ ton Mk I Numbers 148 & 163 at Garden Island Rockingham, Western Australia (Fleet Base West). For restoration story see http://www.defence.gov.au/news/navynews/editions/4719/feature/feature06.htm
 Several 6½ ton Mk I guns on Ascension Island
 6½ ton Mk I at Fort Siloso, Singapore
 6½ ton Mk III of 1869, at Elizabeth Castle, Jersey, UK
 Remains of several 7 ton Mk III guns on Flat Holm island, UK
 Nine 7 ton Mk III guns on Steep Holm island, UK
 A 7-ton Mk I gun at The Citadel, Nova Scotia, Canada
 A 6½ ton Mk I gun on Signal Hill (Cape Town), South Africa.

See also 
 List of naval guns

Notes and references

Bibliography 
 Treatise on the construction and manufacture of ordnance in the British service. War Office, UK, 1877
 Treatise on Ammunition. War Office, UK, 1877
 Victorian Forts Website. Rifled Muzzle Loading Guns
 Sir Thomas Brassey, The British Navy, Volume II. London: Longmans, Green and Co. 1882
 Text Book of Gunnery, 1887. LONDON : PRINTED FOR HIS MAJESTY'S STATIONERY OFFICE, BY HARRISON AND SONS, ST. MARTIN'S LANE 
 Brassey's Naval Annual, 1888

External links 

 Handbook for the 7-inch R.M.L. guns of 6½ and 7 tons on sliding and Moncrieff carriage land service, 1888 at State Library of Victoria
 Diagram showing 7 ton Mk III gun on Moncrieff mounting Mk I
 Diagram showing 7 ton Mk III gun on Moncrieff mounting Mk II

 

Artillery of the United Kingdom
Naval guns of the United Kingdom
178 mm artillery
Victorian-era weapons of the United Kingdom
Coastal artillery
175 mm artillery